Harrison Township is one of sixteen townships in Elkhart County, Indiana. As of the 2010 census, its population was 4,435.

History
Harrison Township was established in the 1830s, and named for William Henry Harrison.

The Joseph J. Rohrer Farm and St. John's Lutheran Church are listed on the National Register of Historic Places.

Geography
Yellow Creek Lake is in this township.

Cities and towns
 Goshen (west edge)
 Wakarusa (east quarter)

Unincorporated towns
 Southwest

Adjacent townships
 Concord Township (north)
 Elkhart Township (east)
 Jackson Township (southeast)
 Union Township (south)
 Locke Township (southwest)
 Olive Township (west)
 Baugo Township (northwest)

Major highways

Cemeteries
The township contains six cemeteries: Hoke, Inbody, Miller, Stutsman, Wenger and Yellow Creek.

Education
Harrison Township residents are eligible to obtain a library card at the Wakarusa-Olive & Harrison Township Public Library in Wakarusa.

References
 
 United States Census Bureau cartographic boundary files

External links
 Indiana Township Association
 United Township Association of Indiana

Townships in Elkhart County, Indiana
Townships in Indiana